Events from the year 1992 in Ireland.

Incumbents
 President: Mary Robinson
 Taoiseach:
 Charles Haughey (FF) (until 11 February 1992)
 Albert Reynolds (FF) (from 11 February 1992)
 Tánaiste: John Wilson (FF)
 Minister for Finance: Bertie Ahern (FF)
 Chief Justice: Thomas Finlay
 Dáil: 
 26th (until 5 November 1992)
 27th (from 14 December 1992)
 Seanad: 19th (until 17 December 1992)

Events
20 January – Peter Brooke offered to resign as Secretary of State for Northern Ireland following criticism of his singing on The Late Late Show only hours after an Irish Republican Army (IRA) bomb exploded.
30 January – Charles Haughey resigned as Taoiseach and as leader of the Fianna Fáil party.
31 January – The Government sold the B+I Shipping Line to the Irish Continental Group.
4 February
Mary Robinson became the first President of Ireland to visit Belfast.
An off-duty Royal Ulster Constabulary officer in Belfast killed three people in a Sinn Féin office before committing suicide.
5 February – Loyalist gunmen killed five Catholics in an attack on a bookmaker's shop in Belfast.
6 February – Albert Reynolds was elected the fifth leader of Fianna Fáil.
11 February – Charles Haughey resigned as Taoiseach and was succeeded by Albert Reynolds.
18 February – Albert Reynolds discussed the situation with other party leaders as the High Court prevented a 14-year-old rape victim from going to Britain for an abortion.
26 February – The Supreme Court lifted the High Court ruling preventing a girl from travelling to Britain for an abortion; it was duly performed.
15 March – Proinsias De Rossa led a breakaway group from the Workers' Party to form what would shortly become Democratic Left. The majority of the breakaway group including De Rossa joined the Labour Party in 1999.
13 April – Two hundred and fifty years after the first performance of Handel's Messiah in Dublin, the Academy of St. Martin in the Fields performed the oratorio at the Point Theatre.
7 May – Bishop Eamon Casey of Galway resigned following the revelation that he was the father of a teenage boy.
8 May – The third People In Need Telethon was held. 
9 May – Linda Martin won the Eurovision Song Contest for Ireland with Why Me?. This was the first of three consecutive Irish wins.
31 May – Christy O'Connor Jnr won the British Masters golf tournament.
18 June – A referendum approved the Maastricht Treaty on European Union: 69.1% voted in favour; 30.9% against.
25 June – The issue of a new, smaller 5 pence coin meant that, after 21 years, it was no longer the same size as a shilling.
8 July – President Mary Robinson addressed both houses of the Oireachtas.
23 September – The IRA destroyed the forensic science laboratory in Belfast with a huge bomb.
5 November – The Government lost a confidence motion and the Dáil was dissolved. Two former Taoisigh, Charles Haughey and Garret FitzGerald, announced their retirement from politics.
6 November – A new purple £20 note depicting Daniel O'Connell was issued.
25 November – Three referendums were held on abortion-related issues. The right to abortion-related travel and the right to abortion-related information were supported.
31 December – Unemployment reached record levels: 290,000 people were out of work.

Undated
An appearance by Christine Buckley on The Gay Byrne Show brought an "overwhelming response" from others who felt they had been victims of incarceration and abuse in industrial schools.
 Trustee Savings Bank dropped the previous Cork and Limerick Savings Bank name.

Arts and literature
 April – Patrick McCabe's novel The Butcher Boy was published.
 11 September – Colm Tóibín's novel The Heather Blazing was published.
 23 September – The Irish Film Institute opened the Irish Film Centre in Dublin.
 30 September – Vincent Woods' play At the Black Pig's Dyke opened at the Druid Theatre Company.
 30 October – Neil Jordan's film The Crying Game was released in Ireland and the U.K.
 Samuel Beckett's first novel, Dream of Fair to Middling Women, was finally published.
 Maeve Binchy's novel The Copper Beech was published.
 Eugene McCabe's novel Death and Nightingales was published.

Sport

Association football
5 April – Shelbourne won their first League of Ireland Championship for thirty years.

Gaelic football
Donegal beat Dublin 0–18 to 0–14 to win their first All-Ireland Senior Football Championship.

Golf
Carroll's Irish Open was won by Nick Faldo (England).

Hurling
Kilkenny beat Cork 3–10 to 1–12 in the All-Ireland Senior Hurling Championship final.

Olympics
8 August – Michael Carruth won Ireland's first gold medal in 36 years at the Olympic Games in Barcelona.  Wayne McCullough won a silver medal.

Births
 13 January – Ryan Connolly, footballer
 16 January – Matt Doherty, footballer
 23 January – Jack Reynor, actor
 27 January – Sam Barry, tennis player
 26 April – Shane O'Meara, actor
 10 May – Sophie Vavasseur, actress
 20 May – Jack Gleeson, actor
 22 July – George Dockrell, cricketer
 27 July – Neil R. Barrett, rugby player
 9 September – Damian McGinty, singer and actor
 27 September – Ryan O'Shaughnessy, pop singer
 18 October – Barry Keoghan, actor
 20 October – John Egan, footballer
 14 November – Tadhg Furlong, rugby union player
 24 November
 Aaron Barry, footballer
 Oliver Dingley, diver
 25 November – Declan Hannon, hurler (Adare, Limerick)
 26 November – Paul Dunne, golfer
 2 December – Danielle Galligan, actress
 4 December – Emma Eliza Regan, actress

Full date unknown
Aisling Dunphy, camogie player

Deaths
9 January – Bill Naughton, playwright and author (born 1910).
20 March – Michael McLaverty, novelist (born 1904).
28 April – Francis Bacon, painter (born 1909).
12 May – Joseph Raftery, archaeologist.
13 May – F. E. McWilliam, sculptor (born 1909).
20 May – James Tully, former Labour Party TD and Cabinet Minister (born 1915).
3 June – Patrick Peyton, the Rosary Priest (born 1909).
6 July – Bryan Guinness, 2nd Lord Moyne, lawyer and poet.
21 July – Aloys Fleischmann, composer and musicologist (born 1910).
17 August – Tom Nolan, Fianna Fáil TD, Minister of State and MEP (born 1921).
23 September – Ivar Ivask, Estonian poet and literary scholar (born 1927).

Full date unknown
Benjamin Guinness, 3rd Earl of Iveagh, peer and Seanad member (born 1937).
Aidan MacCarthy, doctor, RAF medical officer, captured by the Japanese during the Second World War (born 1914).
Matt O'Mahoney, international soccer player (born 1913).
Peter Rice, structural engineer (born 1935).
Jim Young, Cork hurler (born 1915).

See also
1992 in Irish television

References

 
Years of the 20th century in Ireland
Ireland
1990s in Ireland